Lost Songs from the Lost Years is a compilation by Cloud Cult, documenting the evolution of the band from the teen years (early 90s) up until 2002. It was rereleased as a limited edition in 2006 and late 2009.

Track listing
All songs written by Craig Minowa.

Disc one

"1992/1998 - You Never Really Were Alone" (written 1992 remixed 1998) 
"1992 - So Much to Do Out There"
"2002 - Electro Jerry Lewis"
"1996 - Rocketship"
"2001 - Daniel Days"
"2000 - I Can Hardly Believe It"
"2000 - I'm Feeling so Friggin' Fine"
"2002 - I'm Feeling so Fuckin' Fine"
"1994 - Jaded Fable"
"2001 - Armor and Calla Lillies"
"1997 - Fable Practice Space" (Boombox recording)

Disc two

"2002 - In a Rock Band with a Cheap Guitar"
"1999 - Yin and Yang of Sex" (Who Killed Puck? B side)
"1994 - Turn Out the Lights"
"1995 - Alone in a Closet" (From The Shade Project) 
"2002 - Alone on a Farm" (From a They Live on the Sun recording session) 
"1995 - Sage" (From The Shade Project)
"2001 - Lightning Girl" 
"1990 - Counterpoint Practice Space" (Boombox recording of Hangel)

Re-release

In 2009, Cloud Cult announced on their website that they were releasing a limited edition, hand numbered version of the album which "includes a variety of songs that were not included in the previous edition."

Re-release Track Listing

 Step Forward (2005)
 A Place (2007)
 After the Car Crash (2006)
 Dubba-Dubba (2001) (Rename of "Daniel Days" from 2002 release)
 Where Are You Now? (2007)
 Turn Out the Lights (1994)
 Armor and Calla Lillies (2001)
 You Never Really Were Alone (1993/1998)
 Tambourine Man (2006)
 Rocketship (1996)
 Electro Jerry Lewis (2002)
 I'm Feeling So Friggin' Fine (2001)
 Pretty Voice - Part i (2006)
 Intro to Devil Came to Dinner (2005)
 818 (2006)
 Jaded Fable (1994)
 Robot Lights Inside My Head (2004)
 Lightning Girl (2001)

References

External links
Lost Songs from the Lost Years page at CloudCult.com

2002 albums
Cloud Cult albums